Thiallela epicrociella is a species of moth of the family Pyralidae described by Embrik Strand in 1919. It is found in  Taiwan.

References

Moths described in 1919
Phycitinae